The Interstate Highways in Virginia are a total of  of Interstate Highways in the U.S. state of Virginia. Virginia consists of six primary interstate highways, and 10 auxiliary interstates. In addition, 3 more primary and one auxiliary route are planned or under construction.

Primary highways

Auxiliary highways

See also

References

External links
Virginia Gateway at AARoads

Interstates